Thornton Heath is a railway station in the London Borough of Croydon in south London,  down the line from . It is on the Brighton Main Line between Norbury and Selhurst. The station is operated by Southern, who also provide all train services.The station is in Travelcard Zone 4.

Services 
All services at Thornton Heath are operated by Southern using  EMUs.

The typical off-peak service in trains per hour is:
 2 tph to  via 
 2 tph to 
 1 tph to  via 
 3 tph to 
 2 tph to 

History 
The Balham Hill and East Croydon line was constructed by the London Brighton and South Coast Railway (LB&SCR) as a short-cut on the Brighton Main Line to London Victoria, avoiding Crystal Palace and Norwood Junction. It was opened on 1 December 1862. Selhurst station was not however opened until 1 May 1865. According to the Railway Gazette for 30 November 1962 the station was originally called Colliers Water Lane, but the standard history of the line was unable to verify the statement.

The lines were quadrupled in 1903. In 1925 the lines were electrified.

Ticket Gates
Electronic ticket gates were installed at the station in summer 2009, as part of a project sponsored by the Department for Transport. Some minor refurbishment of the main ticket hall was also carried out.

Connections
London Buses routes 50, 130, 198, 250, 450, 663 & N250 serve the station.

References

External links 

Railway stations in the London Borough of Croydon
Former London, Brighton and South Coast Railway stations
Railway stations in Great Britain opened in 1862
Railway stations served by Govia Thameslink Railway
Railway station
1862 establishments in England